Bosideng, officially Bosideng International Holdings Limited, is the largest down clothing company in the PRC. It has 7,579 retail outlets selling down clothing under its six core brands including Bosideng, Snow Flying, Kangbo, Bengen (previously known as Bingjie), Shuangyu and Shangyu. Through these brands, the group offers a wide range of clothing products targeting various consumer segments.

Overview
According to the China Industrial Information Issuing Center (CIIIC), in terms of sales in 2010, Bosideng, Snow Flying, Kangbo and Bengen down clothing products achieved a combined market share of 36.7% in the PRC. "Bosideng" was the leading down clothing brand in the PRC for 16 consecutive years from 1995 to 2010, according to CIIIC and the National Bureau of Statistics of China. The group introduced, for 15 consecutive years, the latest fashionable Fall/Winter clothing trends to the world on behalf of the PRC at the "China International Clothing and Accessories Fair".

Products
To further optimize its product mix and increase profitability, the group has adopted a "non-seasonal product" development strategy. Currently, the non-down clothing products of the Group include Bosideng MAN, BOSIDENG RICCI lady's wears casual wear and D.D. Cat kids wear, VETALLO high-class menswear and the franchise project of ROCAWEAR in the greater China region. The Bosideng menswear business developed rapidly and has already set up 979 retail outlets throughout China, while the franchise project of ROCAWEAR in the greater China region has opened 7 consignment counters in major cities including Beijing, Shanghai and Hangzhou. Apart from investing in the continuous development of the above non-down clothing businesses, the group is actively exploring opportunities to merge and acquire non-down clothing brands with high development potential and good reputation in order to further increase the proportion of non-down clothing business in total sales.

External links

Bosideng Official Website
Custom Soccer Jerseys & Uniforms
NBA Jerseys & Hardwood Classics Jerseys

Chinese brands
Clothing brands
Clothing companies of China
Companies based in Shanghai
Clothing companies established in 1975
Clothing brands of China
Chinese companies established in 1975
Privately held companies of China
Companies listed on the Hong Kong Stock Exchange